Virgilio Rodríguez Macal (June 28, 1916 – February 13, 1964) was a Guatemalan writer, journalist, and diplomat who won various international and national prizes. As a novelist he is noted for integrating his deep knowledge of Mesoamerican and Guatemalan history and geography into his stories, often setting his novels in colorful Guatemalan jungle settings including its biologically rich flora and fauna.

Biography
Macal was born on June 28, 1916 in Guatemala City. He is considered one of the most popular novelists in Central American literature. Many of his works are based in the departments of Alta Verapaz and Baja Verapaz and are noted for displaying his factual knowledge of the fauna and traditions and the richness of his characters and locations.

His most acclaimed work is his novel La mansión del pájaro serpiente which has been translated into several languages. His personality, like that of men born in the early decades of the twentieth century, was influenced by the long dictatorship of Jorge Ubico, the revolution of 1944 and by the so-called liberation movements which occurred in 1954.
 
Macal also served some time as a diplomat, and was a consul in Barcelona, Spain. Later Rodriguez Macal, settled in Santiago, Chile for many years, and was a frequent collaborator of the great newspaper El Mercurio. Later, residing in Guatemala, he was the director of Diario de Centroamérica.

Noted books

Guayacán

This book contains some similarities with the author's life as the main character Valentine Ochaeta returns after several years studying abroad, his hometown, with a suitcase full of hopes and dreams that are contrary to the reality of their families who are in misery. This forces the subject of the novel to become more adventurous in the jungles of Peten as he seeks fortune out of the plight of his family. Through this journey he explores the roots of Guatemala history and their ancestors as he matures and becomes a man.

The novel addresses the issues facing the hopes and dreams experienced by the young juveniles juxtaposed against the stark reality that confronts them as an adult. The novel won the Central sciences, Literature and Fine Arts Award on September 15, 1953.

El mundo del misterio verde
This book contains the stories collected from the lips of the Q'eqchi' Indian Lish Zenzeyul. The fauna and flora from the jungles of Peten and Verapaz are portrayed in this picturesque novel entering a "world of green mystery" as it means, with snakes and monkeys contrasted against the white man's world, the men of cities. In his words, the forest is more open and more logical than civilisation.

La mansión del pájaro serpiente
Meaning "the mansion of the snake bird" the author makes beneficial use of the oral histories of Mayan mythology and the experiences of the novel's subject, the tireless adventurer. Beautiful stories where animals humanize themselves from the jungles of the Central American tropics are told in a colorful story surrounded by the lush greenery of the tropical forest.

Carazamba

The novel is a narrative work set in 1940s Guatemala. The novel takes the reader to different latitudes of the country, from the port city of Livingston, Izabal, to the jungle region of Peten. This novel tells of the misfortunes of the narrator and his steward Pedro. This book, apart from having much action and romance, is told in an emotional style with an element of "disguised" political criticism towards the military government during this period in the country of Guatemala.

Works
 La mansión del pájaro serpiente°
 El mundo del misterio 
 Carazamba
 Jinaya
 Guayacán 
 Negrura
 Sangre y clorofila

Guatemalan male writers
Guatemalan novelists
Male novelists
1916 births
1964 deaths
20th-century Guatemalan people
20th-century novelists
20th-century male writers